Union Sportive Dudelange was a football club from Dudelange in southern Luxembourg, and the predecessor of Luxembourg's second tier team F91 Dudelange.

History
The team was founded in 1912 as a merger between Minerva Dudelange and Jeunesse de la Frontière 1908 Dudelange. Under German occupation in World War II, its name was changed to SV Düdelingen as part of the Germanisation program.

The team was strongest in the late 1930s and 1940s. They won the Luxembourg Cup in 1939 and came runners-up in the Luxembourg National Division four times, reaching another cup final in 1958.

In 1991, the team merged with Alliance Dudelange and Stade Dudelange into the current F91 Dudelange. The new club inherited Alliance's place in the Luxembourg Division of Honour (second tier) as the other two entities were in the 1. Division (third).

References

1912 establishments in Luxembourg
1991 disestablishments in Luxembourg
Association football clubs established in 1912
Association football clubs disestablished in 1991
Defunct football clubs in Luxembourg
Sports teams in Dudelange
F91 Dudelange